The Ratlam – Gwalior Intercity Express is an intercity train service which runs between Ratlam Junction railway station of Ratlam of Central Indian state of Madhya Pradesh and Gwalior Junction railway station of Gwalior, the important city of the madhya pradesh .

Number and nomenclature

The number provided for the service is
11125 - From Ratlam to Gwalior
11126 - From Gwalior to Ratlam

Arrival and departure

Train no.11125 departs from Ratlam Sunday, Monday, Wednesday and Thursday at 17:10 hrs. reaching Gwalior the day following the next day at 7:47  hrs.
Train no.11126 departs from Gwalior Monday, Tuesday, Thursday and Friday at 19:30 hrs., reaching Ratlam the day following next day at 10:45 hrs.

Route and halts

The train goes via Barnagar, Indore, Dewas, Ujjain, Maksi, Guna and Shivpuri.

The important halts of the train are:

Coach composite

The train generally consist of 19 Coaches as follows :

 1 AC 2 Tier
 4 AC 3 Tier
 8 Sleeper Coach
 4 Second Class Coaches
 2 Luggage cum Parcel

Average speed and frequency

The train runs with an average speed of 46 km/h. The train runs on 4 days in a week.

Rake Sharing

The train shares its rake with 21125/21126 Ratlam - Bhind Express

See also

 Ratlam - Bhind Express
 Bhopal–Gwalior Intercity Express
 Indore–Amritsar Express
 Indore - Bhopal Intercity Express

References

External links

 
 

Transport in Gwalior
Intercity Express (Indian Railways) trains
Rail transport in Madhya Pradesh
Transport in Ratlam